WZBR (1410 AM) is a radio station that is silent. Licensed to Dedham, Massachusetts, United States, the station serves the Greater Boston area. The station is owned by Langer Broadcasting Group, LLC, which also owns WSRO in the area. WZBR also operates translator station W251CR (98.1 FM) in Medford.

History
Alan C. Tindal, Kristian Solberg, Paul Monson, and John J. Sullivan, doing business as Associated Broadcasters, applied to build a daytime-only radio station on 1410 kHz in Brockton, on October 9, 1957; Tindal and Solberg were part owners of WSPR in Springfield, and Monson and Sullivan were also associated with that station. Later that month, a second application for the frequency was filed by Simon Geller, proposing a station in Gloucester. The Federal Communications Commission (FCC) initiated comparative hearing proceedings in 1960; that August, Geller amended his application to instead operate on 1540 kHz, and Associated was granted a construction permit on November 22. The station, assigned the call sign WOKW, went on the air July 17, 1961, and was licensed on November 28. WOKW was affiliated with the Mutual Broadcasting System by 1968, and had a middle of the road format.

The callsign changed to WAMK on September 28, 1981; to WATD on December 15, 1985; and to WMSX on April 1, 1990.

On June 10, 2013, WMSX filed an application to move from Brockton to Dedham, with a transmitter in the Hyde Park neighborhood of Boston. Langer soon announced his intention to use the station as a Boston extension of his Framingham-area Portuguese language station, WSRO, with its own studios in Hyde Park. Langer signed the station on from its new site on the Hyde Park-Dedham border on October 23, 2013, testing with jazz music. The station transmits from a small Valcom fiberglass antenna next to the river; the antenna was previously used a decade earlier (in a different location) by Langer's original WSRO (prior to its own move into the Boston area as WAZN), and had to be cleaned up after a decade of disuse. On November 12, 2013, the station changed its call sign to the current WZBR.

In early 2014, WZBR began simulcasting WSRO; the jazz programming was moved to Langer's newly acquired Cape Cod station, WBAS, ahead of that station joining the WSRO simulcast as well. WZBR's new facility was licensed on February 11, 2014. In December 2014, WZBR and WBAS began carrying some separate programming from WSRO; by 2015, the three stations were jointly branded as "Rede ABR".

On February 3, 2016, WZBR dropped the Portuguese programming and launched an urban contemporary format, known as "The Bass of Boston". The new format, whose studios were located near Dudley Square, was operated by Frank Holder and programmed by Steve Gousby, both of whom had previously been associated with Boston's longtime Black-oriented station, WILD. In September 2016, New Edition lead singer Ralph Tresvant launched his Friday afternoon, radio show "Inside The Ride" on WZBR. In 2018, the station rebranded as "98.1 The Urban Heat" to reflect the sign-on of its FM translator.

Langer Broadcasting took WZBR and its translator silent in mid-July 2020, due to financial difficulties; the shutdown was concurrent with the suspension of operations of WSRO and WBAS, which had continued with the "Rede ABR" Portuguese programming. The "Urban Heat" programming continues to be available online. WZBR resumed broadcasting on November 4, 2020. , WZBR served as an analog simulcast of WSRO, which had converted to digital-only operation on December 1, and was programming jazz music; after WSRO switched to classical music in 2022, the jazz programming remained on WZBR.

WZBR again went silent on March 5, 2023; the shutdown of WSRO and WZBR followed the death of Alex Langer. Both stations had been put up for sale prior to his death; WBAS had already been sold off in 2021.

FM translator

References

External links

ZBR
Radio stations established in 1961
Mass media in Plymouth County, Massachusetts
Companies based in Dedham, Massachusetts
1961 establishments in Massachusetts